Saranga is a 1994 Pakistani Action film, directed by Mohammad Aslam Murad and produced by Rai Mohammad Yousuf.

Cast
 Saima - Sakina
 Sultan Rahi - Saranga
 Ghulam Mohayuddin (Deputy Inspector Police) Mansoor
 Gori - Shukhaan
 Sabiha Khanum - (Chiragh Khan's wife)
 Badar Munir - Subaydar Qamar Khan
 Tanzeem Hassan - Maloo
 Humayun Qureshi - Siyana
 Zahir Shah - Majoo
 Tariq Shah - Jalad Khan
 Ilyas Kashmiri - Khan Baba
 Ladla
 Saleem Hassan
 Nasrullah Butt (Guest appearance) as Chiragh Khan
 Altaf Khan Inspector Police (Guest appearance)

Track list
The music of the film Saranga is by musician Zulfiqar Ali. Film song lyrics are penned by Saeed Gillani, and the singers are Noor Jehan and Masood Rana

References

External links
 

1994 action films
1994 films
Punjabi-language Pakistani films
Pakistani action films
1990s Punjabi-language films